The following television stations operate on virtual channel 2 in the United States:

 K02KN-D in Kanarraville, etc., Utah
 K02LJ-D in Nondalton, Alaska
 K02OG-D in Dolores, Colorado
 K02OS-D in Weber Canyon, Colorado
 K02OU-D in Ismay Canyon, Colorado
 K02RA-D in Beaumont, Texas
 K02RJ-D in Kalispell & Lakeside, Montana
 K03EY-D in Parlin, Colorado
 K05EY-D in Terrace Lakes, Idaho
 K05NG-D in Cedar Canyon, Utah
 K06AE-D in Prescott, Arizona
 K06HT-D in Ely, Nevada
 K06MK-D in Elko, Nevada
 K06NS-D in Chiloquin, Oregon
 K06NY-D in Ryndon, Nevada
 K06QN-D in Judith Gap, Montana
 K07HM-D in Big Piney, etc., Wyoming
 K07NR-D in Lakeview, etc., Oregon
 K07ZL-D in Leavenworth, Washington
 K07ZP-D in Bull Lake Valley, Montana
 K07ZV-D in Sigurd & Salina, Utah
 K07ZW-D in Marysvale, Utah
 K07ZX-D in Woodland & Kamas, Utah
 K07ZZ-D in East Price, Utah
 K07AAA-D in Helper, Utah
 K07AAB-D in Roosevelt, etc., Utah
 K08AY-D in Winthrop-Twisp, Washington
 K08EZ-D in Mink Creek, Idaho
 K08IO-D in Wells, Nevada
 K08JP-D in Dryden, Washington
 K08JV-D in Broadus, Montana
 K08OW-D in Hysham, Montana
 K08PC-D in Hildale, etc. (AZ), Utah
 K08PM-D in Wagner, South Dakota
 K08PN-D in Homer, etc., Alaska
 K08PP-D in Rosebud, etc., Montana
 K08PZ-D in Corvallis, Oregon
 K08QA-D in Aurora, etc., Utah
 K09CJ-D in Cedar City, Utah
 K09DF-D in Juliaetta, Idaho
 K09DW-D in Ruth, Nevada
 K09EA-D in Ely & McGill, Nevada
 K09MH-D in White Sulphur Spring, Montana
 K09PL-D in Dingle, etc., Idaho
 K09TH-D in Gunnison, Colorado
 K09VL-D in Boyes & Hammond, Montana
 K09XK-D in Sheridan, Wyoming
 K09XY-D in Coolin, Idaho
 K09YR-D in Harlowton, Montana
 K10AH-D in Emigrant, Montana
 K10BD-D in Winthorp-Twisp, Washington
 K10BU-D in Lund & Preston, Nevada
 K10GF-D in Miles City, Montana
 K10GT-D in Mina/Luning, Nevada
 K10IX-D in Newberry Springs, California
 K10MA-D in Waunita Hot Springs, Colorado
 K10NC-D in Kenai, etc., Alaska
 K10RP-D in Santa Clara, Utah
 K11RN-D in Douglas, Wyoming
 K11VY-D in Toquerville, Utah
 K12AV-D in Pateros/Mansfield, Washington
 K12CW-D in Mallott Wakefield, Washington
 K12LX-D in Powderhorn, Colorado
 K12MM-D in Girdwood Valley, Alaska
 K12MW-D in Manhattan, Nevada
 K12OG-D in Taos, New Mexico
 K12RA-D in Colstrip, Montana
 K13KU-D in Delta Junction, Alaska
 K14JY-D in Walker Lake, Nevada
 K14OB-D in Eureka, Nevada
 K14QS-D in Wanship, Utah
 K14QY-D in Rural Sevier County, Utah
 K14RA-D in Teasdale/Torrey, Utah
 K14RC-D in Richfield, etc., Utah
 K14RD-D in Koosharem, Utah
 K14RE-D in Panguitch, Utah
 K14RF-D in Cody, Wyoming
 K14RH-D in Henrieville, Utah
 K14RL-D in Samak, Utah
 K14RM-D in Laketown, etc., Utah
 K14RT-D in Fruitland, Utah
 K14SA-D in Wray, Colorado
 K15FD-D in Holyoke, Colorado
 K15FL-D in Park City, Utah
 K15FT-D in Roswell, New Mexico
 K15HE-D in Hatch, Utah
 K15HG-D in Mount Pleasant, Utah
 K15HH-D in Green River, Utah
 K15HJ-D in Ridgecrest, etc., California
 K15IG-D in Deming, New Mexico
 K15KQ-D in Coalville, Utah
 K15KS-D in Garfield, etc., Utah
 K15LB-D in Red Lodge, Montana
 K16CS-D in Pinedale, etc., Wyoming
 K16FD-D in Battle Mountain, Nevada
 K16FS-D in Woody Creek, Colorado
 K16HV-D in Mayfield, Utah
 K16IZ-D in Eureka, Nevada
 K16LR-D in Artesia, New Mexico
 K16MA-D in Frost, Minnesota
 K16MY-D in Ashland, Montana
 K16NE-D in Forsyth, Montana
 K17DF-D in Crowley Lake, California
 K17DS-D in Clarendon, Texas
 K17HE-D in Susanville, etc., California
 K17HT-D in Hanksville, Utah
 K17JP-D in Big Timber, etc., Montana
 K17MN-D in Carlsbad, New Mexico
 K18HF-D in Gallup, New Mexico
 K18HH-D in The Dalles, Oregon
 K18JG-D in Beowawe, Nevada
 K18JU-D in Utahn, Utah
 K18KA-D in Ely, Nevada
 K18KC-D in Wendover, Utah
 K18MC-D in Enterprise, Utah
 K19GM-D in Circleville, Utah
 K19HQ-D in Virgin, Utah
 K19IF-D in Nephi, Utah
 K19IX-D in Romeo, Colorado
 K19JO-D in Harlowton, etc., Montana
 K19LC-D in Pagosa Springs, Colorado
 K19LD-D in Bayfield, Colorado
 K19MA-D in Leamington, Utah
 K19MM-D in Ruth, Nevada
 K20EC-D in Kanab, Utah
 K20GQ-D in Las Vegas, New Mexico
 K20KB-D in Huntington, Utah
 K20LT-D in Diamond Basic, etc., Wyoming
 K20ND-D in Summit County, Utah
 K20NL-D in Grays River/Lebam, Washington
 K20NZ-D in Garden Valley, Idaho
 K20OD-D in Valmy, Nevada
 K21CC-D in Lewiston, Idaho
 K21EF-D in Pitkin, Colorado
 K21IR-D in Childress, Texas
 K21JU-D in Meeteetse, Wyoming
 K22CI-D in Lander, Wyoming
 K22FS-D in Beaver, etc., Utah
 K22IE-D in Navajo Mtn. Sch., etc., Utah
 K22IF-D in Oljeto, Utah
 K22IG-D in Mexican Hat, Utah
 K22JY-D in Truth or Consequences, New Mexico
 K22JZ-D in Spring Glen, Utah
 K22MY-D in Jackson, Minnesota
 K22NC-D in Scipio/Holden, Utah
 K22NN-D in Forsyth, Montana
 K22NU-D in Golconda, Nevada
 K22OI-D in Carbondale, Colorado
 K23KL-D in Farmington, New Mexico
 K23NS-D in Rockaway Beach, Oregon
 K23OE-D in Kasilof, Alaska
 K23OX-D in Holyoke, Colorado
 K24FF-D in Lovelock, Nevada
 K24GD-D in Hardin, Montana
 K24KR-D in Jacks Cabin, Colorado
 K24LS-D in Lucerne Valley, California
 K24MY-D in Kanarraville, Utah
 K25FR-D in Elko, Nevada
 K25IX-D in Huntsville, etc., Utah
 K25KR-D in Round Mountain, Nevada
 K26CS-D in St. James, Minnesota
 K26DB-D in Astoria, Oregon
 K26GL-D in Columbus, Montana
 K26LW-D in Sheridan, Wyoming
 K26NV-D in Fishlake Resort, Utah
 K26NX-D in Madras, Oregon
 K26OM-D in Shoshoni, Wyoming
 K27AI-D in Ninilchik, etc., Alaska
 K27GB-D in Beryl/Modena/New C, Utah
 K27GL-D in Hobbs, New Mexico
 K27HP-D in Alamogordo, New Mexico
 K27MX-D in Baker Valley, Oregon
 K27ND-D in Aztec, New Mexico
 K27OF-D in Crested Butte, Colorado
 K27ON-D in Lucerne Valley, California
 K28FT-D in Milton-Freewater, Oregon
 K28JN-D in Manti, etc., Utah
 K28LG-D in Bridger, etc., Montana
 K28OM-D in Escalante, Utah
 K28ON-D in Castle Rock, etc., Montana
 K28PB-D in McDermitt, Nevada
 K28PS-D in Ruidoso, New Mexico
 K28QA-D in Sapinero, Colorado
 K29BN-D in Silver Springs, etc., Nevada
 K29IE-D in St. James, Minnesota
 K29KJ-D in Orovada, Nevada
 K29LB-D in Vernal, etc., Utah
 K29LQ-D in Polson, Montana
 K29MG-D in Hawthorne, Nevada
 K29NH-D in Lund & Preston, Nevada
 K30FO-D in Peetz, Colorado
 K30GO-D in Pleasant Valley, Colorado
 K30JB-D in Morgan, etc., Utah
 K30KK-D in Fountain Green, Utah
 K30LF-D in Duchesne, Utah
 K30LY-D in Manila, etc., Utah
 K30MX-D in Wyodak, Wyoming
 K30ON-D in Capitol Reef National Park, Utah
 K30OO-D in Caineville, Utah
 K30OQ-D in Fremont, Utah
 K30OT-D in Tropic/Cannonville, Utah
 K30OU-D in Cody, etc., Wyoming
 K30QA-D in Coeur d'Alene, Idaho
 K31CI-D in Montpelier, Idaho
 K31DR-D in Caballo, New Mexico
 K31FZ-D in Haxtun, Colorado
 K31JB-D in Hanna, etc., Utah
 K31JF-D in Boulder, Utah
 K31JL-D in Vernal, etc., Utah
 K31JN-D in Scofield, Utah
 K31JX-D in Rockville, Utah
 K31KS-D in Lechee, etc., Arizona
 K31MC-D in Spring Glen, etc., Utah
 K31NB-D in Santa Fe, New Mexico
 K31NP-D in Rural Garfield County, Utah
 K31NZ-D in Eagle Nest, New Mexico
 K31OD-D in Henefer, etc., Utah
 K31OJ-D in Delta, etc., Utah
 K31OK-D in Beaver, etc., Utah
 K32AB-D in Yuma, Colorado
 K32AG-D in Parowan/Enoch, etc., Utah
 K32CJ-D in Ely, Nevada
 K32LY-D in La Grande, Oregon
 K32LZ-D in Alton, Utah
 K32NK-D in Lincoln City, etc., Oregon
 K33DS-D in Freedom-Etna, Wyoming
 K33ER-D in Verdi/Mogul, Nevada
 K33JG-D in Peoa/Oakley, Utah
 K34DI-D in Pendleton, Oregon
 K34JN-D in Montezuma Creek-Aneth, Utah
 K34JO-D in Bluff & area, Utah
 K34KO-D in Tulia, Texas
 K34KP-D in Clear Creek, Utah
 K34LE-D in Shurz, Nevada
 K34OI-D in Logan, Utah
 K34PJ-D in Tillamook, Oregon
 K34PT-D in Julesburg, Colorado
 K34PU-D in Crested Butte, Colorado
 K35CV-D in Shoshoni, Wyoming
 K35EM-D in Quitaque, Texas
 K35EW-D in Heber/Midway, Utah
 K35GA-D in La Grande, Oregon
 K35IC-D in Bonners Ferry, Idaho
 K35LD-D in Prineville, Oregon
 K35LJ-D in Crested Butte, Colorado
 K35NB-D in Polson, Montana
 K35NN-D in Randolph & Woodruff, Utah
 K35PL-D in Roundup, Montana
 K36HA-D in Elko, Nevada
 K36IB-D in Midland, etc., Oregon
 K36IC-D in Golconda, etc., Nevada
 K36IF-D in Orangeville, Utah
 K36IR-D in Garrison, etc., Utah
 K36KI-D in Fillmore, etc., Utah
 K36PC-D in Emery, Utah
 K36PD-D in Green River, Utah
 K36PF-D in Ferron, Utah
 K36PJ-D in Howard, Montana
 K36PO-D in Winnemucca, Nevada
 K40DJ-D in Coolin, Idaho
 K41MZ-D in Livingston, etc., Montana
 K43MB-D in Orderville, Utah
 K44EN-D in Methow, Washington
 K46AF-D in Blanding/Monticello, Utah
 K46IV-D in Antimony, Utah
 K48EK-D in Long Valley Junction, Utah
 KACV-TV in Amarillo, Texas
 KASA-TV in Santa Fe, New Mexico
 KATN in Fairbanks, Alaska
 KATU in Portland, Oregon
 KBOI-TV in Boise, Idaho
 KCBS-TV in Los Angeles, California
 KCWQ-LD in Palm Springs, California
 KCWX in Fredericksburg, Texas
 KDKA-TV in Pittsburgh, Pennsylvania
 KDTN in Denton, Texas
 KETS in Little Rock, Arkansas
 KGAN in Cedar Rapids, Iowa
 KGFE in Grand Forks, North Dakota
 KHON-TV in Honolulu, Hawaii
 KJRH-TV in Tulsa, Oklahoma
 KMID in Midland, Texas
 KMYU in St. George, Utah
 KNAZ-TV in Flagstaff, Arizona
 KNCD-LD in Nacogdoches, Texas
 KNOP-TV in North Platte, Nebraska
 KOTI in Klamath Falls, Oregon
 KPRC-TV in Houston, Texas
 KQTV in St. Joseph, Missouri
 KREM in Spokane, Washington
 KSNC in Great Bend, Kansas
 KTCA-TV in St. Paul, Minnesota
 KTCI-TV in St. Paul, Minnesota
 KTUU-TV in Anchorage, Alaska
 KTVI in St. Louis, Missouri
 KTVN in Reno, Nevada
 KTVQ in Billings, Montana
 KTVU in Oakland, California
 KTWO-TV in Casper, Wyoming
 KUNW-CD in Yakima, Washington
 KUSD-TV in Vermillion, South Dakota
 KUTV in Salt Lake City, Utah
 KWGN-TV in Denver, Colorado
 KXMA-TV in Dickinson, North Dakota
 KXZQ-LD in Durango, Colorado
 W09AT-D in Fajardo, Puerto Rico
 W28EH-D in Adjuntas, Puerto Rico
 W28EQ-D in Utuado, Puerto Rico
 WBAY-TV in Green Bay, Wisconsin
 WBBM-TV in Chicago, Illinois
 WBRZ-TV in Baton Rouge, Louisiana
 WCBD-TV in Charleston, South Carolina
 WCBS-TV in New York, New York
 WDIQ in Dozier, Alabama
 WDPN-TV in Wilmington, Delaware
 WDTN in Dayton, Ohio
 WESH in Daytona Beach, Florida
 WETP-TV in Sneedville, Tennessee
 WFMY-TV in Greensboro, North Carolina
 WGBH-TV in Boston, Massachusetts
 WGCI-LD in Skowhegan, Maine
 WGRZ in Buffalo, New York
 WHNH-CD in Manchester, etc., Vermont
 WJBK in Detroit, Michigan
 WKAQ-TV in San Juan, Puerto Rico
 WKRN-TV in Nashville, Tennessee
 WKTV in Utica, New York
 WLBZ in Bangor, Maine
 WLMO-LD in Fort Wayne, Indiana
 WMAB-TV in Mississippi State, Mississippi
 WMAR-TV in Baltimore, Maryland
 WPBT in Miami, Florida
 WSB-TV in Atlanta, Georgia
 WTWO in Terre Haute, Indiana
 WUND-TV in Edenton, North Carolina
 WUVF-LD in Naples, Florida

The following stations, which are no longer licensed, formerly operated on virtual channel 2:
 K02KZ-D in Kobuk, Alaska
 K04DS-D in Kenai River, Alaska
 K05ET-D in Likely, California
 K08BG-D in Troy, Montana
 K10KB-D in Austin, Nevada
 K21LV-D in Perryton, Texas
 K23EC-D in Canadian, Texas
 K30IV-D in Wallowa, Oregon
 K35DK-D in Granite Falls, Minnesota
 K36KL-D in Gruver, Texas
 K40JV-D in Stateline, etc., California
 K44AK-D in Memphis, Texas
 K44HA-D in Preston, Idaho
 K44LL-D in Austin, Nevada
 K45KT-D in Sargents, Colorado
 K47BP-D in Follett, Texas
 K47GM-D in New Mobeetie, Texas
 KITM-LD in Lahaina, Hawaii

References

02 virtual